EU Business School (formerly European University) is a private business school with campuses in Geneva and Montreux (Switzerland), Barcelona (Spain) and Munich (Germany).

European University may also refer to:

 European University of Tirana, Tirana, Albania
 European University of Armenia
 Alma Mater Europaea of the European Academy of Sciences and Arts, Salzburg, Austria
 European University of Bangladesh, a private university in Bangladesh
 European University College Brussels, former name of Hogeschool-Universiteit Brussel, Belgium 
 European University of Lefke, Lefka, Cyprus
 European University Cyprus, Nicosia, Cyprus
 European University of Brittany, France
 European University (ევროპის უნივერსიტეტი), Tbilisi, Georgia
 European University Viadrina in Brandenburg, Germany
 European University Institute, Florence, Italy
 European University-North Macedonia, Skopje, Macedonia 
 European University of Lisbon, Lisbon, Portugal
 European University at Saint Petersburg, Saint Petersburg, Russia
 European University, Belgrade, a private university in Serbia
 European University of Madrid (Universidad Europea), Madrid, Spain 
 European University of Valencia, a university in Spain

See also
 Medieval University
 Central European University in Budapest and Vienna
 European University Association